Gornitzky & Co., is a law firm in Israel. Its offices are in Tel Aviv, and it has a branch in Herzlia Pituach. The firm was established in 1938 by Israel Gornitzky. It is headed by Pinhas Rubin and co-managed by Lior Porat and Kfir Yadgar.

The firm represents major banks in Israel and abroad; investment companies; housing and construction companies; hi-tech and telecommunications companies; insurance companies; hotel and tourism companies. The firm has also represented the Israeli government.

References

External links
 
 Official LinkedIn page
  The new offices of Gornitzky & Co. by The Marker weekly.

Law firms established in 1938
Law firms of Israel
Companies based in Tel Aviv